Júlia Isabelle Bergmann (born February 21, 2001) is a German-Brazilian volleyball player who plays as an outside hitter for the Brazil women's national volleyball team

Early life

Júlia Isabelle Bergmann was born and raised in Munich, Germany to a Brazilian mother and German father. She and her family moved to Brusque, Brazil in 2011 when she was in the fourth grade. She has said her parents decided to move the family to Brazil so her and her brother could experience another country with a different culture, learn the language, and learn how to adapt with different people. She is fluent in German, Portuguese, and English, and speaks some French and Spanish.

She attended high school at Amplo High School in Brusque, Brazil. Both of her parents played volleyball, so she began taking up the sport in fifth grade. After just two years of playing volleyball, she began representing her city in high level tournaments. Bergmann opted to attend college at Georgia Tech, something she knew she wanted to do from a young age in order to play volleyball and study physics.

Career

College
Bergmann joined the Georgia Tech Yellow Jackets volleyball team in 2019.  As a freshman, she led the team in kills and was named Atlantic Coast Conference Freshman of the Year. 

As a junior in 2021, Bergmann helped the team to the 2021 NCAA tournament final eight, the first time the team got to that round in 18 years. She was named an AVCA First Team All-American and ACC Player of the Year in 2021. She finished the regular season 12th in the NCAA in points (577.5) and 13th in the country in kills (497), both stats which led the ACC.

Professional clubs

 Avotol/Toledo (2015–2016)
 Brusque (2016–2018)

Brazil national team
Bergmann could have played for either the Brazilian or German national team. She chose to join Brazil's nation team while still in college, she made her Brazilian national team debut at the 2019 Women's Nations League tournament, earning a silver medal with the team, and also participated in the 2019 Pan American Games. 

In May 2022, Bergmann was named to the 25-player roster for the 2022 FIVB Volleyball Nations League tournament. In her debut as a starting outside hitter for the national team, she was the highest scorer in kills in their defeat of Germany.

Awards and honors

Clubs

 2017-2018 Catarinense Championship –  Silver medal, with Brusque. 
 2016-2017 Brazilian Superliga B –  Bronze medal, with Brusque. 
 2016-2017 Taça Prata –  Gold medal, with Brusque.

International

2022 FIVB Nations League –  Silver medal, with Brazilian national team. 
2019 FIVB Nations League –  Silver medal, with Brazilian national team.

College

2022 AVCA Second Team All-American
2022 All-ACC First Team
2021 AVCA First Team All-American
2021 Volleyball Magazine First Team All-American
2020 AVCA All-America Honorable Mention
2020 All-ACC First Team
2019 ACC Freshman of the Year
2019 AVCA Regional Freshman of the Year
2019 First Team All-ACC
2019 ACC All-Freshman Team

References

2001 births
Living people
Outside hitters
Sportspeople from Munich
Brazilian women's volleyball players
German women's volleyball players
Georgia Tech Yellow Jackets women's volleyball players